The inner or epidermic coat of the hair follicle is closely adherent to the root of the hair, and consists of two strata named respectively the outer and inner root sheaths.

Outer root sheath

The outer root sheath corresponds with the stratum mucosum (stratum germinativum and stratum spinosum) of the epidermis, and resembles it in the rounded form and soft character of its cells; at the bottom of the hair follicle these cells become continuous with those of the root of the hair.

Inner root sheath

The inner root sheath (IRS) consists of 
 a delicate cuticle next the hair, composed of a single layer of imbricated scales with atrophied nuclei; 
 Huxley's layer
 Henle's layer

The term "trichilemmal" refers to the outer root sheath. The IRS functions to mould, adhere, as well as participate in the keratinization of growing hair.

References

External links 
 
 

Hair anatomy